Gayle Manning (born March 2, 1950) is a member of the Ohio House of Representatives, serving since 2019. Formerly, she was a member of the Ohio Senate, serving the Thirteenth District from 2011 to 2018. Manning also taught elementary school students in North Olmsted City Schools for 37 years, winning numerous awards and citations for her accomplishments in education. She was named Educator of the Year by the North Olmsted Council of PTA and received the Teacher in American Enterprise Award from the Ohio Council on Economic Education.

Key Legislation
Senator Manning co-sponsored legislation in 2013 that the Lorain Morning Journal hailed as “life-saving.” The legislation allows law enforcement officers quicker access to cell phone records of people who are believed to be kidnapped or missing and in danger.

Controversies

Then Senator Manning drew criticism after a report published by the League of Women Voters of Ohio on May 6, 2019 released a 2011 email from the Senator to  Ray DiRossi, a Republican operative contracted for $105,000 to draw new district lines for state elections after the 2010 census. After mentioning that “[She] knows they are looking for Republicans in Lorain County” Senator Manning listed several individual streets within the city of Lorain where she had previously “gained a good response from the people.”

Another email from the same report detailed a meeting between DiRossi and Senator Manning in “the bunker”, the name DiRossi and his staff described a Double Tree hotel room just outside the statehouse. The report concluded that this taxpayer-funded hotel room was used “to ensure no one could gain access to the redistricting plans”. According to the League of Women Voters, for meetings like Senator Manning's “every effort was made to conduct deliberations in private”.

References

External links
Gayle Manning.com, official campaign website
Project Vote Smart- Gayle Manning
Gayle Manning- Ohio GOP

Living people
1950 births
People from North Ridgeville, Ohio
Kent State University alumni
University of Akron alumni
Republican Party Ohio state senators
Women state legislators in Ohio
21st-century American politicians
21st-century American women politicians